María Altagracia Moronta Hernández (born 6 July 1996) is a Dominican boxer. She competed in the women's welterweight event at the 2020 Summer Olympics.

References

1996 births
Living people
Dominican Republic women boxers
Olympic boxers of the Dominican Republic
Boxers at the 2020 Summer Olympics
Place of birth missing (living people)
Medalists at the 2019 Pan American Games
Pan American Games medalists in boxing
Boxers at the 2019 Pan American Games
Competitors at the 2018 Central American and Caribbean Games
Central American and Caribbean Games medalists in boxing
Welterweight boxers
Pan American Games bronze medalists for the Dominican Republic